Prima Sport is a Romanian network of sports channels owned and operated by the media group Clever. The package includes four channels called Prima Sport 1, Prima Sport 2, Prima Sport 3, Prima Sport 4, and Prima Sport 5. It was launched in 2011, under the name Transilvania L!VE and after other names, the channels became Prima Sport on April 19, 2022.

History

Transilvania L!VE was launched on December 19, 2011. It was run by Transilvania Media Group, a media company owned by businessman Arpad Paszkany. On February 14, 2012, a second channel was launched, Transilvania LOOK.

The name was changed in October 2012 to Look TV and Look Plus.

Both channels were sold in March 2014 to Intel Sky Broadcasting LTD, the company that bought the rights for the Liga I and Cupa Ligii and needed their own television channels to distribute the content. On July 1st, 2014, the HD version of both channels was launched.

In September 2017 it was sold to Clever Media Network SRL, owned by businessman Adrian Tomşa.

Look Sport 2 and Look Sport 3 were launched on August 16, 2019.

In 2020, LookPlus was changed to a second channel of sports programming under the name Look Sport+.

On April 19, 2022, Look Sport became Prima Sport 1, Look Sport+ became Prima Sport 2, Look Sport 3 changed its name to Prima Sport 3 and Look Sport 2 became Prima Sport 4.

Shows
 Fotbal All Inclusive, hosted by Radu Banciu.
 Fotbal Show, a football talk show, hosted by Vlad Măcicășan, Mădălin Negoiță and Cristian Jacodi as executive producer.
 Prima Motors, with Alexandru Cocu.
 Notele lui Banciu, with Radu Banciu and Vlad Măcicășan (weekly show).
 Nimic despre offside, with Emil Grădinescu and Cristi Costache.

Sport competitions

  Liga I
  Liga II
  Cupa României
  Supercupa României
  UEFA Champions League
  UEFA Super Cup
  UEFA Youth League
  La Liga
  Bundesliga
  2. Bundesliga
  DFL-Supercup
  Serie A
  Coppa Italia
  Supercoppa Italiana
  Ligue 1
  Premier League
  Primeira Liga
  Süper Lig
  Belgian First Division A 
 Best of the Best Kickboxing
 Formula One
 Formula Two
 Formula Three
 Porsche Supercup
 MotoGP
 World Men's Handball Championship
 World Women's Handball Championship
  European Men's Handball Championship
  European Women's Handball Championship
  EHF Champions League
  EHF European League
  EHF European Cup
  Women's EHF Champions League
  Women's EHF European League
  Women's EHF European Cup
  UEFA Futsal Champions League
  Basketball Champions League
  Romanian Superliga (water polo)
  Liga Națională (men's basketball)

References

External links
 Official website

Television stations in Romania
Sports television in Romania
Television channels and stations established in 2011
Premier League on television
Sports television networks